The ROH World Six-Man Tag Team Championship is a professional wrestling championship owned by the Ring of Honor (ROH) promotion. Like most professional wrestling championships, the title is won as a result of a match with a predetermined outcome. The Embassy (Brian Cage, Kaun and Toa Liona) are the current champions in their first reign as a team (Kaun's second individually).

History
The title was officially announced in a press release on August 30, 2016, and marked the first new title created by ROH in six years, following the 2010 creation of the ROH World Television Championship. ROH promoted the title as the first time in nearly 25 years that a major American promotion had had a six-man tag team title. 

The championship belts were redesigned in January 2018.

Inaugural championship tournament (2016)
The tournament to crown the inaugural ROH World Six-Man Tag Team Champions took place between September 30 and December 2, 2016. The tournament featured participants from the Mexican Consejo Mundial de Lucha Libre (CMLL) and Japanese New Japan Pro-Wrestling (NJPW) promotions, both of which ROH had partnerships with. ROH noted how six-man tag team matches were a staple of Mexican lucha libre and how NJPW had recently created its own six-man tag team championship, the NEVER Openweight 6-Man Tag Team Championship. Lio Rush was originally announced for the tournament, but ended up being replaced by NJPW wrestler Kushida. However, Rush eventually returned to the team, replacing ACH in the final due to his departure from ROH. The tournament started on September 30 at the All Star Extravaganza VIII pay-per-view (PPV), with the remaining first round and semifinal matches taking place at the October 1 and 29 tapings of the weekly Ring of Honor Wrestling program. The final of the tournament took place at the Final Battle PPV.

Participants
A. C. H./Lio Rush, Jay White & Kushida
The Addiction (Christopher Daniels & Frankie Kazarian) & Kamaitachi
The Briscoes (Jay Briscoe & Mark Briscoe) & Toru Yano
Bullet Club (Adam Cole, Matt Jackson & Nick Jackson)
The Cabinet (Caprice Coleman, Kenny King & Rhett Titus)
Jason Kincaid, Leon St. Giovanni & Shaheem Ali
The Kingdom (Matt Taven, T. K. O'Ryan & Vinny Marseglia)
Team CMLL (Hechicero, Okumura & Último Guerrero)

Reigns
There have been 14 reigns shared among 12 teams and 33 wrestlers. The Kingdom (Matt Taven, T. K. O'Ryan & Vinny Marseglia) were the inaugural champions and they have the record with the most reigns at three as a team, while individually Vinny Marseglia/Vincent has the most reigns with four.

The Embassy (Brian Cage & Gates of Agony (Kaun & Toa Liona)) are the current champions in their first reign as a team,  Indivudually, this is the second reign for Kaun and first for Cage and Lion. They defeated Dalton Castle & The Boys (Brandon Tate & Brent Tate) in Arlington, Texas at Final Battle on December 10, 2022.

Combined reigns

By team

By wrestler

References

External links
 ROH Six Man Tag Team Title History at Cagematch.net

Ring of Honor championships
Trios wrestling tag team championships
World professional wrestling championships